Paul J. Gannon (born May 21, 1960) is a former member of the Massachusetts House of Representatives. He is a South Boston Democrat who represented the 4th Suffolk district from 1991 to 1995. He is an attorney who graduated from Providence College and The Catholic University of America's Columbus School of Law.

References
 Public officers of the Commonwealth of Massachusetts (1993–1994). Massachusetts General Court. p. 130.

Democratic Party members of the Massachusetts House of Representatives
Providence College alumni
Columbus School of Law alumni
1960 births
Living people